Bartosz Kaniecki (born July 11, 1988 in Łódź) is a Polish footballer.

Career
He is trainee of Widzew Łódź. In the winter 2010, he was loaned to Concordia Piotrków Trybunalski. He returned half year later.

References

External links
 

1988 births
Living people
Footballers from Łódź
Polish footballers
Association football goalkeepers
Widzew Łódź players
Bałtyk Gdynia players
Concordia Piotrków Trybunalski players
Lechia Gdańsk players
Wisła Płock players
Ekstraklasa players